The Loop Live festival is a music festival in Bulgaria.  Since 2007 it is held once a year on Prince Alexander of Battenberg Square in the capital city Sofia. It's a free music event and always includes a host of new and popular artists. The festival is usually televised a week afterwards on City TV.

2007
Date: 7 October 2007
Attendance: 50,000
Line-Up
Asle Bjorn & Anne
Freemasons with Amanda Wilson
Jaba of Yves La Rock
Lumidee 
Måns Zelmerlöw
Million Stylez 
Outlandish
Yarabi

2008
Date: 5 October 2008
Attendance: 50,000
Line-Up
Shaggy (headlining)
Burhan G 
DJ Andi feat. Stella
Ida Corr feat. Burhan G
Lexter
Matt Pokora
Verona

2009
Date: 11 October 2009
Attendance: 50,000
Line-Up
Kelly Rowland (headlining) 
Eddie Wata
Guru Josh Project 
ILLmate feat. RuthVessy
Inna
Katerine Avgoustakis
Miroslav Kostadinov
Tom Boxer

Other information
In 2008, singers Ida Corr and Shaggy met backstage, and decided there to collaborate on a song for Ida Corr's album Under The Sun. In 2009 "Under The Sun" (feat. Shaggy) was released as a single.

See also
List of electronic music festivals
Live electronic music

References

External links 
 loop.bg

Music festivals established in 2007
2007 establishments in Bulgaria
Culture in Sofia
Electronic music festivals in Bulgaria
Annual events in Sofia
Autumn events in Bulgaria